Treze Futebol Clube is a Brazilian football team from Campina Grande in Paraíba, founded on September 7, 1925. Historically, the club has competed in the Campeonato Brasileiro Série A several times. Recently, the club has competed only in lower divisions of the national league, the Copa do Brasil, the regional Copa do Nordeste and the Paraíba State Championship

The main rival of Treze is Campinense, another traditional football club from Campina Grande. They have a long-standing rivalry, being collectively known as the Maiorais. This is considered as the most important derby in the countryside of Brazil. There is also a rivalry between Treze and Botafogo (PB), a football club from João Pessoa (Paraíba's capital), due to some historical issues between the two cities.

The club own the Presidente Vargas stadium, which has a theoretical capacity of 12,000, but an approved capacity of 3,800. Games are often played at the state-owned stadium Amigão.

Treze is currently ranked second among Paraíba teams in CBF's national club ranking at 67th place overall. They are the best placed team in the state from outside of Greater João Pessoa.

History

Foundation
The club was founded on September 7, 1925 by Antônio Fernandes Bioca and twelve other football fans. The group usually played football at a field which is now João Pessoa street. Antônio Fernandes Bioca introduced football to Paraíba, after bringing the first football to the state.

First team
In 1925, Treze's first team was José Rodolfo, José Casado, Alberto Santos, Zacarias Ribeiro "Cotó" and Plácido Veras "Guiné", Eurico, Zacarias do Ó, José Eloy, Olívio Barreto, Osmundo Lima and José de Castro.

First game
Treze's first official match was played on 1 May 1926, at Campo dos Currais, which is now the site of a public market. Treze beat Palmeiras, an established team from the state capital João Pessoa, 1-0. Plácido Veras (known as Guiné), one of the thirteen founders of the club, scored the goal, to become the scorer of the first official Treze goal.

State Championship
In 1939, Treze became the first team from outside the metropolitan region of João Pessoa to enter the Campeonato Paraibano. They won their first title in 1940 and have a total of 15 championship titles.

In 1966, Treze won the Campeonato Paraibabo undefeated, recording 12 victories and 2 draws, and conceding only 5 goals

National Competition
Treze have competed in the top tier of the Brazilian football league system a total of 9 times, including the combined tournaments held in 1986, 1987 and 2000. They have competed a further 7 times in the second tier, 12 times in the third tier and 5 times in the fourth tier. They have gained promotion twice from Série D, in 2011, when a 5th-placed finish meant they replaced Rio Branco-AC who were excluded from the competition and in 2018.

In 1999, Treze were the first Paraíba State team to progress beyond the first stage of the Copa do Brasil, beating Santa Cruz. Treze lost the first leg 2-3 in Campina Grande, but then won the second leg 4-2 in Recife.

Current squad

Titles
National
Campeonato Brasileiro Série B (1): 1986 

State
Campeonato Paraibano (16): 1940, 1941, 1950, 1966, 1975, 1981, 1982, 1983, 1989, 2000, 2001, 2005, 2006, 2010, 2011, 2020

Seasons in National League divisions

Série A

Serie B

Série C

Série D

Team colors

Treze's colors are black and white. They usually play in black and white vertical stripes, black shorts and black socks. Its away kit is almost all-white, with the exception being its black socks.

Club name and mascot
The name Treze translates Thirteen in English, the number of the founders of the club. The mascot is a rooster as it represents the number 13 in Jogo do Bicho (an illicit gambling game in Brazil).

References

External links

Trezenet
Official site 

 
Association football clubs established in 1925
Football clubs in Brazil
Football clubs in Paraíba
1925 establishments in Brazil